Leslie Wolfe (born 1967) is a bestselling American novelist.

Early life and education

Leslie Wolfe exhibited an interest in literature at a young age. She was encouraged by her mother, who owned several thousand titles in the family library. She gave Wolfe reading assignments of increasing difficulty, matching her evolving interests. By age 10, it was all about cloaks, daggers, and adventure, with Jules Verne and Alexandre Dumas. By age 16, Edgar Allan Poe, Leo Tolstoy, but also A.J. Cronin, Margaret Mitchell, and W. Somerset Maugham kept Wolfe company. Then history and geopolitics caught her attention for a while, enticing her to read about the making of the atomic bomb and the most relevant moments of World War II. As a young adult, she explored the fascinating world of science fiction, with the works of Isaac Asimov and Frank Herbert.

As a teenager, Wolfe tutored younger children, her family encouraging her entrepreneurial spirit. Her unusual, yet popular and highly effective teaching methods included the literary analysis of hit music lyrics, which she called, "the only surviving form of modern-day poetry."

Career

Wolfe began writing stories at a young age and published several short stories before finishing school. However, she followed a career path in business, putting her writing aspirations on the back burner for a while. She published her first novel, Executive, in 2011, while working as a senior business leader. The novel was received well by critics and readers, and later received inquiries from Hollywood.

Leaving the coveted world of corporate boardrooms for the blissful peace of what she calls "the Wolves' den," Wolfe applied herself to her one true passion, writing. To date, Wolfe has published thirteen novels and a multi-author collaboration anthology.

Screenwriting

Encouraged by the feedback received from readers of her books, and by the interest manifested by the movie industry, Wolfe wrote Adverse in 2016, an adaptation of her debut novel Executive for the big screen.

Writing style

Wolfe's novels break the mold of traditional thrillers. She is passionate about technology and psychology. Her extensive background and research in these fields empower and add texture to her multidimensional, engaging writing style.

She has been recognized many times as one of the few women who endeavor on the almost exclusively male turf of political thrillers and espionage.

Regardless of how prominently technology is featured in Wolfe's novels, mostly people go awry in Wolfe's often cautionary tales. Whether it's unchecked, destructive corporate greed (Executive) or personal weakness setting the stage for blackmail by a foreign interest (The Backup Asset), Wolfe surprises with remarkable understanding and portraying of human frailty, strife, and growth.

Readers and critics describe her books as incredibly fast and engaging, while educational at the same time. "Reads like a movie," is the common theme in the feedback received from many critics and reviewers. Wolfe's novels are mainly plot driven, although her future plans include the exploration of different themes and literary techniques, more character driven.

Influencers

With diverse interests as a reader, Wolfe noted Isaac Asimov and Frank Herbert as her most influential science fiction authors. Nora Roberts, Sidney Sheldon, Thomas Harris, and David Baldacci have also left their mark on Wolfe's craft.

However, the most notable influencer for Wolfe was Michael Crichton. Wolfe admires Crichton's versatile talent and acute, analytical mind. She wishes she could have had the privilege to meet Crichton before his untimely death.

Favorite Quotes

•	"A goal without a plan is just a wish." – Antoine de Saint-Exupéry

•	"What one man can do, another can do." – Charles Morse in the movie The Edge, written by David Mamet

•	"Imagination is more important than knowledge." – Albert Einstein

Fiction Foretells the Future

1. Executive (2011)

In Chapter 39 of her debut novel, Wolfe describes an out-of-control drone, crashing on Florida Highway 98.

Two years later, on July 17, 2013, a drone crashed on the same Florida Highway 98, only a few miles west of the spot Wolfe described in her book.

The fictional crash took lives; the real one fortunately didn't. As for the causes of the two crashes, they are uncannily similar.

2. The Backup Asset (2015)

Wolfe depicts a  guided missile destroyer as being the US Navy's biggest asset, posing a challenge for Russia. On May 20, 2016, the Navy announced the first Zumwalt-class destroyer was delivered from the manufacturer. News articles released in June and July 2016 feature Zumwalt generously, calling it the "greatest match-up ever" against Russia's s.

Trivia

The soundtrack for Executive'''s video trailer was mixed by Wolfe personally. Digital sound mixing is one of her hobbies.

Personal life

Leslie Wolfe lives in Florida with her husband, "the Wolfe," and their dog. She enjoys engaging with her readers every day, exchanging emails and Facebook postings. Other than such remote engagements, Wolfe is a private person.

Like many other authors, Wolfe is somewhat of a hermit. When working on a new novel, Wolfe doesn't leave the house for days in a row, choosing to stay locked in her office, focused on her work until the new novel is ready.

Charities

Wolfe has involved herself, many times anonymously, in supporting the Wikimedia Foundation, the California YWCA, an EMS/Air Rescue Service, North American Wild Wolves, and several dog rescue organizations.

Bibliography

Tess Winnett SeriesDawn Girl (2016)The Watson Girl (2017)Glimpse of Death (2017)Taker of Lives (2018)Not Really Dead (2020)Girl with A Rose (2020)Mile High Death (2020)The Girl They Took (2021)

Detective Kay Sharp Series 
 The Girl From Silent Lake (2021)
 Beneath Blackwater River (2021)
 The Angel Creek Girls (2021)

Baxter and Holt Series 
 Las Vegas Girl (2018)
 Casino Girl (2018)
 Las Vegas Crime (2018)

Standalone Titles 

Stories Untold (2017)
Love, Lies and Murder (2019)
The Girl You Killed (2021)

Alex Hoffmann Series
 Executive (2011)
 Devil's Move (2014)
 The Backup Asset (2015)
 Ghost Pattern (2015)
 Operation Sunset (2016)

Screenplays
 Adverse (2016)

References

External links

Leslie Wolfe at Stage32
Leslie Wolfe's profile

1967 births
Living people
American thriller writers
American women novelists
American crime fiction writers
American mystery novelists
Techno-thriller writers
21st-century American novelists
American military writers
Novelists from Florida
Mensans
Place of birth missing (living people)
Women crime fiction writers
Women mystery writers
Women thriller writers
21st-century American women writers
American women non-fiction writers
21st-century American non-fiction writers